The Mount Parker Cable Car was a cable car system in Hong Kong, connecting Quarry Gap (between Mount Parker and Mount Butler) and Quarry Bay near the present location of Yau Man Street.

The 2.3 kilometre-long cable car was built to provide a means of transport for employees of the Swire Group between the staff quarters uphill, and Taikoo Dockyard and Taikoo Sugar Refinery downhill. It operated between 1892 and 1932. The path of the cable car left by the stubs of the supporting concrete pillars is partially accessible and can be hiked in around 90 minutes.

References

External links 

Taikoo Ropeway [1891–1932] at gwulo.com

 https://swirenews.swire.com/uploads/docs/1588908830-5eb4d31e3945f1.pdf
Transport in Hong Kong
Quarry Bay
Gondola lifts